Velocity Publishing is a publishing company that started The Little Black Book for every busy woman in Charleston, SC, in May 1999.  The publication is a word of mouth directory for women; all featured businesses and service providers included in the directory have been recommended by women in the target community.  The Little Black Book for every busy woman is online at EveryBusyWoman.com.

The first issue of The Little Black Book for every busy woman debuted in January 2000 in Charleston, SC.  In December 2002, LBB LLC was created exclusively to handle the franchising division of The Little Black Book for every busy woman.

Current directories include:
The Little Black Book for every busy woman
The Guide for Every Busy Mom 
The Guide for Every Busy Bride

The Little Black Book for every busy woman serves the following communities:
Annapolis, MD
Macon, GA
Charleston, SC
Greenville, SC and Anderson, SC
Jacksonville, FL
Washington DC
Raleigh-Durham, NC and Chapel Hill, NC
Savannah, GA

All Velocity Publishing periodicals feature illustrations by Cindy Luu.

References

External links
Velocity Publishing Online Guides

Book publishing companies of the United States